Siwarut Pholhirun (born September 23, 1996), is a Thai professional footballer who plays as a winger for Thai League 2 club Nakhon Si United.

References

External links
https://th.soccerway.com/players/siwarut-phonhiran/412331/

1996 births
Living people
Siwarut Pholhirun
Association football wingers
Siwarut Pholhirun
Siwarut Pholhirun
Siwarut Pholhirun
Siwarut Pholhirun
Siwarut Pholhirun
Siwarut Pholhirun
Siwarut Pholhirun
Siwarut Pholhirun
Nakhon Si United F.C. players